The 1994 Giro di Lombardia was the 88th edition of the Giro di Lombardia cycle race and was held on 8 October 1994. The race started and finished in Monza. The race was won by Vladislav Bobrik of the Gewiss–Ballan team.

General classification

References

1994
Giro di Lombardia
Giro di Lombardia
Giro Di Lombardia
October 1994 sports events in Europe